

Sri Lanka

Tamil genocide

The Sri Lankan military was accused of committing human rights violations during Sri Lanka's 26-year civil war. A United Nation's Panel of Experts looking into these alleged violations found "credible allegations, which if proven, indicate that serious violations of international humanitarian law and international human rights law were committed by both the Government of Sri Lanka and the LTTE, some of which would amount to war crimes and crimes against humanity". Some activists and politicians also accused the Sri Lankan government which is dominated by Sinhalese people (who predominantly practice Theravada Buddhism of carrying out a genocide against the minority Sri Lankan Tamil people, who are mostly Hindu, both during and after the war.

Bruce Fein alleged that Sri Lanka's leaders committed genocide, along with Tamil Parliamentarian Suresh Premachandran. Refugees who escaped from Sri Lanka also stated that they fled from genocide, and various Sri Lankan Tamil diaspora groups echoed these accusations.

In 2009, thousands of Tamils protested against the atrocities in cities all over the world. (See 2009 Tamil diaspora protests.) Various diaspora activists formed a group called Tamils Against Genocide to continue the protest. Legal action against Sri Lankan leaders for alleged genocide has been initiated. Norwegian human rights lawyer Harald Stabell filed a case in Norwegian courts against Sri Lankan President Rajapaksa and other officials.

Politicians in the Indian state of Tamil Nadu also made accusations of genocide. In 2008 and 2009 the Chief Minister of Tamil Nadu M. Karunanidhi repeatedly appealed to the Indian government to intervene to "stop the genocide of Tamils", while his successor J. Jayalalithaa called on the Indian government to bring Rajapaksa before international courts for genocide. The women's wing of the Communist Party of India, passed a resolution in August 2012 finding that "Systematic sexual violence against Tamil women" by Sri Lankan forces constituted genocide, calling for an "independent international investigation".

In January 2010, a Permanent Peoples' Tribunal (PPT) held in Dublin, Ireland, found Sri Lanka guilty of war crimes and crimes against humanity, but it found insufficient evidence to justify the charge of genocide. The tribunal requested a thorough investigation as some of the evidence indicated "possible acts of genocide". Its panel found Sri Lanka guilty of genocide at its 7–10 December 2013 hearings in Berman, Germany. It also found that the US and UK were guilty of complicity. A decision on whether India, and other states, had also acted in complicity was withheld. PPT reported that LTTE could not be accurately characterized as "terrorist", stating that movements classified as "terrorist" because of their rebellion against a state, can become political entities recognized by the international community. The International Commission of Jurists stated that the camps used to intern nearly 300,000 Tamils after the war's end may have breached the convention against genocide.

In 2015, Sri Lanka's Tamil majority Northern Provincial Council (NPC) "passed a strongly worded resolution accusing successive governments in the island nation of committing 'genocide' against Tamils".
 The resolution asserts that "Tamils across Sri Lanka, particularly in the historical Tamil homeland of the NorthEast, have been subject to gross and systematic human rights violations, culminating in the mass atrocities committed in 2009. Sri Lanka's historic violations include over 60 years of state sponsored anti-Tamil pogroms, massacres, sexual violence, and acts of cultural and linguistic destruction perpetrated by the state. These atrocities have been perpetrated with the intent to destroy the Tamil people, and therefore constitute genocide."

The Sri Lankan government denied the allegations of genocide and war crimes.

Easter bombings

On 21 April 2019, Easter Sunday, three churches in Sri Lanka and three luxury hotels in the commercial capital, Colombo, were targeted in a series of coordinated Islamic terrorist suicide bombings. Later that day, there were smaller explosions at a housing complex in Dematagoda and a guest house in Dehiwala. A total of 267 people were killed, including at least 45 foreign nationals, three police officers, and eight bombers, and at least 500 were injured. The church bombings were carried out during Easter services in Negombo, Batticaloa and Colombo; the hotels that were bombed were the Shangri-La, Cinnamon Grand, Kingsbury and Tropical Inn. According to the State Intelligence Service, a second wave of attacks was planned, but was stopped as a result of government raids. President of the European Parliament Antonio Tajani referred to the bombings as an act of genocide.

Chechnya

Following the dissolution of the Soviet Union in 1991, Chechnya declared its independence from the Russian Federation. Russian President Boris Yeltsin refused to accept Chechnya's independence; subsequently, the conflict between Chechnya and the Russian Federation escalated until it reached its climax when Russian troops invaded Chechnya and launched the First Chechen War in December 1994, and in September 1999, they invaded Chechnya again and launched the Second Chechen War. By 2009, Chechen resistance was crushed and the war ended with Russia re-establishing its control over Chechnya. Numerous war crimes were committed during both conflicts. Amnesty International estimated that in the First Chechen War alone, between 20,000 and 30,000 Chechens were killed, mostly in indiscriminate attacks which were launched against them by Russian forces in densely populated areas, and that a further 25,000 civilians died in the Second Chechen War.

Some scholars estimated that the Russian government's brutal attacks against such a small ethnic group amounted to a crime of genocide. The German-based NGO Society for Threatened Peoples accused the Russian authorities of genocide in its 2005 report on Chechnya. On 18 October 2022, Ukraine's parliament condemned the "genocide of the Chechen people" during the First and Second Chechen War.

Nigeria

Boko Haram and Fulani herdsman 

Since the turn of the 21st century, 62,000 Nigerian Christians have been killed by the terrorist group Boko Haram, Fulani herdsmen and other groups. The killings have been referred to as a silent genocide.

Democratic Republic of the Congo
During the Congo Civil War (1998–2003), pygmies were hunted down and eaten by both sides in the conflict, who regarded them as subhuman. Sinafasi Makelo, a representative of Mbuti pygmies, asked the UN Security Council to recognize cannibalism as both a crime against humanity and an act of genocide. Minority Rights Group International reported evidence of mass killings, cannibalism and rape. The report, which labeled these events as a campaign of extermination, linked the violence to beliefs about special powers held by the Bambuti. In Ituri district, rebel forces ran an operation code-named "Effacer le tableau" (to wipe the slate clean). The aim of the operation, according to witnesses, was to rid the forest of pygmies.

Darfur

The Darfur genocide is the systematic killing of ethnic Darfuri people which has occurred during the ongoing conflict in Western Sudan. It has become known as the first genocide of the 21st century. The genocide, which is being committed against the Fur, Masalit and Zaghawa tribes, has led the International Criminal Court (ICC) to indict several people for crimes against humanity, rape, forced transfer and torture. Over 2.8 million civilians have been displaced and the death toll is estimated at 300,000 killed.

People's Republic of China

Uyghur genocide

The Uyghur genocide is the ongoing series of human rights abuses which are being perpetrated against the Uyghur people and other ethnic and religious minorities which live both in and around the Xinjiang Uyghur Autonomous Region (XUAR) of the People's Republic of China by the Chinese government. Since 2014, the Chinese government, under the direction of the Chinese Communist Party (CCP) during the administration of CCP general secretary Xi Jinping, has pursued policies which have lead to the internment of more than one million Muslims and they are currently being held in secretive internment camps without any legal process (the majority of them are Uyghurs) in what has become the largest-scale detention of ethnic and religious minorities since the Holocaust. Critics of the policy have described it as the Sinicization of Xinjiang and have called it an ethnocide or cultural genocide, while some governments, activists, independent NGOs, human rights experts, academics, government officials, and the East Turkistan Government-in-Exile have called it a genocide.

In particular, critics have highlighted the concentration of Uyghurs in state-sponsored internment camps, suppression of Uyghur religious practices, political indoctrination, severe ill-treatment, and testimonials of alleged human rights abuses including forced sterilization, contraception, and abortion. Chinese government statistics show that from 2015 to 2018, birth rates in the mostly Uyghur regions of Hotan and Kashgar fell by 84%. In the same period, the birth rate of the whole country decreased by 9.69%, from 12.07 to 10.9 per 1,000 people. Chinese authorities acknowledged that birth rates dropped by almost a third in 2018 in Xinjiang, but denied reports of forced sterilization and genocide. Birth rates have continued to plummet in Xinjiang, falling nearly 24% in 2019 alone when compared to just 4.2% nationwide.

In July 2020, German anthropologist Adrian Zenz wrote in Foreign Policy that his estimate had increased since November 2019, estimating that a total of 1.8 million Uyghurs and other Muslim minorities had been extrajudicially detained in what he described as "the largest incarceration of an ethnoreligious minority since the Holocaust", arguing that the Chinese Government was engaging in policies in violation of the United Nations Convention on the Prevention and Punishment of the Crime of Genocide. Ethan Gutmann estimated in December 2020 that 5 to 10% of detainees had died each year in the camps.

Myanmar

Myanmar's government has been accused of crimes against the Muslim Rohingya minority that are alleged to amount to genocide. For many years, the Rohingya had been one the primary targets of hate crimes and discrimination in the country, much of which was given tacit encouragement by extremist nationalist Buddhist monks and the military-controlled government. Muslim groups have claimed that they were subjected to genocide, torture, arbitrary detention, and cruel, inhuman, and degrading treatment.

On 25 August 2017, the Myanmar military forces and local Buddhist extremists started attacking the Rohingya people and committing atrocities against them in the country's north-west Rakhine State. The atrocities included attacks on Rohingya people and locations, looting and burning down Rohingya villages, mass killing of Rohingya civilians, gang rapes, and other sexual violence.

Médecins Sans Frontières (MSF) estimated in December 2017 that during the persecution, the military and the local Buddhists killed at least 10,000 Rohingya people. At least 392 Rohingya villages in Rakhine state were reported as burned down and destroyed, as well as the looting of many Rohingya houses, and widespread gang rapes and other forms of sexual violence against the Rohingya Muslim women and girls. The military drive also displaced a large number of Rohingya people and made them refugees. According to the United Nations reports, over 700,000 Rohingya people had fled or had been driven out of Rakhine state who then took shelter in the neighboring Bangladesh as refugees. In December 2017, two Reuters journalists who had been covering the Inn Din massacre event were arrested and imprisoned.

The 2017 persecution against the Rohingya Muslims and non-Muslims has been termed as ethnic cleansing and genocide by various United Nations agencies, International Criminal Court officials, human rights groups, and governments. British prime minister Theresa May and United States Secretary of State Rex Tillerson called it "ethnic cleansing" while the French President Emmanuel Macron described the situation as "genocide". The United Nations described the persecution as "a textbook example of ethnic cleansing". In late September that year, a seven-member panel of the Permanent Peoples' Tribunal found the Myanmar military and the Myanmar authority guilty of the crime of genocide against the Rohingya and the Kachin minority groups. The Myanmar leader and State Counsellor Aung San Suu Kyi was again criticized for her silence on the issue and her support of the military's actions. Subsequently, in November 2017, the governments of Bangladesh and Myanmar signed a deal to facilitate the return of Rohingya refugees to their native Rakhine state within two months, drawing a mixed response from international onlookers.

In August 2018, the office of the United Nations High Commissioner for Human Rights, reporting the findings of their investigation into the August–September 2017 events, declared that the Myanmar military—the Tatmadaw, and several of its commanders (including Commander-in-chief Senior General Min Aung Hlaing)—should face charges in the International Criminal Court for "crimes against humanity", including acts of "ethnic cleansing" and "genocide", particularly for the August–September 2017 attacks on the Rohingya.

South Sudan 

During the South Sudanese Civil War there were ethnic undertones to the conflict between the South Sudan People's Defence Forces and the Sudan People's Liberation Movement-in-Opposition, which has been accused of being dominated by the Dinka ethnic group. A Dinka lobbying group known as the "Jieng Council of Elders" was often accused of being behind hardline SPLM policies. While the army used to attract men who were members of different tribes, during the war, a large number of the SPLA's soldiers were from the Dinka stronghold of Bahr el Ghazal, and within the country the army was often referred to as "the Dinka army". Much of the worst atrocities committed are blamed on a group known as "Dot Ke Beny" (Rescue the President) or "Mathiang Anyoor" (Brown caterpillar), while the SPLA claim that it is just another battalion. Immediately after the alleged coup in 2013, Dinka troops, and particularly Mathiang Anyoor, were accused of carrying out pogroms, assisted by guides, in house to house searches of Nuer suburbs, while similar door to door searches of Nuers were reported in government held Malakal. About 240 Nuer men were killed at a police station in Juba's Gudele neighborhood. During the fighting in 2016–17 in the Upper Nile region between the SPLA and the SPLA-IO allied Upper Nile faction of Uliny, Shilluk in Wau Shilluk were forced from their homes and Yasmin Sooka, chairwoman of the Commission on Human Rights in South Sudan, claimed that the government was engaging in "social engineering" after it transported 2,000 mostly Dinka people to the abandoned areas. The king of the Shilluk Kingdom, Kwongo Dak Padiet, claimed his people were at risk of physical and cultural extinction. In the Equatoria region, Dinka soldiers were accused of targeting civilians on ethnic lines against the dozens of ethnic groups among the Equatorians, with much of the atrocities being blamed on Mathiang Anyoor. Adama Dieng, the U.N.'s Special Adviser on the Prevention of Genocide, warned of genocide after visiting areas of fighting in Yei. Khalid Boutros of the Cobra faction as well as officials of the Murle led Boma State accuse the SPLA of aiding attacks by Dinka from Jonglei state against Boma state, and soldiers from Jonglei captured Kotchar in Boma in 2017. In 2010, Dennis Blair, the United States Director of National Intelligence, issued a warning that "over the next five years, ... a new mass killing or genocide is most likely to occur in southern Sudan." In April 2017, Priti Patel, the Secretary of the United Kingdom's Department for International Development, declared the violence in South Sudan as genocide.

Islamic State (ISIL or ISIS) 

ISIL or ISIS compels people who live in the areas that it controls to live according to its interpretation of sharia law. There have been many reports of the group's use of death threats, torture and mutilation in order to compel people to convert to Islam, as well as reports of clerics being killed for refusing to pledge allegiance to the so-called "Islamic State". ISIL commits violence against Shia Muslims, Alawites, Assyrian, Chaldean, Syriac and Armenian Christians, Yazidis, Druze, Shabaks and Mandeans in particular. Among the known killings of civilians who were members of religious and other minority groups which were carried out by ISIL were those killings which were committed in the villages and towns of Quiniyeh (70–90 Yazidis killed), Hardan (60 Yazidis killed), Sinjar (500–2,000 Yazidis killed), Ramadi Jabal (60–70 Yazidis killed), Dhola (50 Yazidis killed), Khana Sor (100 Yazidis killed), Hardan area (250–300 Yazidis killed), al-Shimal (dozens of Yazidis killed), Khocho (400 Yazidis killed and 1,000 abducted), Jadala (14 Yazidis killed) and Beshir (700 Shia Turkmen killed), and others committed near Mosul (670 Shia inmates of the Badush prison killed), and in Tal Afar prison, Iraq (200 Yazidis killed for refusing conversion). The UN estimated that 5,000 Yazidis were killed by ISIL during the takeover of parts of northern Iraq in August 2014. In late May 2014, 150 Kurdish boys from Kobani aged 14–16 were abducted and subjected to torture and abuse, according to Human Rights Watch. In the Syrian towns of Ghraneij, Abu Haman and Kashkiyeh 700 members of the Sunni Al-Shaitat tribe were killed for attempting to launch an uprising against ISIL rule. The UN reported that in June 2014 ISIL had killed a number of Sunni Islamic clerics who refused to pledge allegiance to it. By 2014, a U.N. Humans Rights commission counted that 9,347 civilians had been murdered by ISIL in Iraq, then however; by 2016 a second report by the United Nations estimated 18,802 deaths.
The Sinjar massacre in 2014 resulted in the killings of between 2,000 and 5,000 civilians.

Yemen

In 2015, coalition forces led by Saudi Arabia and the UAE, intervened in the already ongoing Yemeni Civil War on behalf of the government forces. The intervention has been described as a genocide against Yemenis by some commentators due to war crimes and its role in the humanitarian crisis in Yemen. The Saudi-led campaign had a dramatic worsening effect on the humanitarian crisis in Yemen by contributing to the famine in Yemen. Over 78% of the population, 20 million people, were in need of humanitarian assistance in 2015 according to the UN. The intervention also contributed to the outbreak of cholera which has infected hundreds of thousands. The blockade of Yemen by Saudi warships which began in 2015 also worsened the situation, leaving the many in without access to food, water and medical aid. Aid to Yemen to relieve the situation was often delayed by the Saudi blockade, leading to further deaths. On 1 July 2015, the UN declared for Yemen a "level-three" emergency—the highest UN emergency level—for a period of six months. By December 2015, 2.5 million Yemeni people were internally displaced by the fighting, and 1 million more fled the country.

The coalition forces been accused of war crimes, including deliberately targeting civilian areas, including hospitals, schools, refugee camps, and public infrastructure. The entire Saada Governorate was declared a military target by the coalition in May 2015; Human Rights Watch (HRW) later expressed concern that the bombing was causing unnecessarily harming civilians. cluster munitions, and white phosphorus munitions were reportedly used on multiple occasions by the coalition. In March 2017, HRW reported that "Since the start of the current conflict, at least 4,773 civilians had been killed and 8,272 wounded, the majority by coalition airstrikes.... Human Rights Watch has documented 62 apparently unlawful coalition airstrikes, some of which may amount to war crimes, that have killed nearly 900 civilians, and documented seven indiscriminate attacks by Houthi-Saleh forces in Aden and Taizz that killed 139 people, including at least eight children."

Ethiopia

The Ethiopian and Eritrean governments have repeatedly been accused of committing a genocide in the Tigray Region.

In November 2020, Genocide Watch upgraded its alert status for Ethiopia as a whole to the ninth stage of genocide, extermination, referring to the Gawa Qanqa massacre, casualties of the Tigray War, 2020 Ethiopia bus attack and the Metekel massacre and listing affected groups as the Amhara, Tigrayans, Oromo, Gedeo, Gumuz, Agaw and Qemant.
Peace researcher and founder of the Institute for Peace and Security Studies, Mulugeta Gebrehiwot, stated on 27 January 2021 that the killings of Tigrayans by the Ethiopian National Defense Force (ENDF) and Eritrean Defence Forces (EDF) were "literally genocide by decree. Wherever they're moving, whomever they find, they kill him or her, [whether it's] an old man, a child, a nursing women, or anything." On 20 November 2021, Genocide Watch again issued a Genocide Emergency Alert for Ethiopia, stating that "both sides are committing genocide", and that "Prime Minister Abiy Ahmed's hate speech and calls for war" together with attacks by the ENDF and TPLF put Ethiopia into stages 4 (dehumanization), 6 (polarization), 8 (persecution), and 9 (extermination) of the ten stages of genocide.

As of late 2022, the combined impact of wartime violence, famine and a lack of medical access had killed an estimated 385,000-600,000 people, with other reported estimates reaching numbers as high as 700,000-800,000 killed.

Ukraine

On 24 February 2022, Russian leader Vladimir Putin ordered the Russian invasion of Ukraine. Following months of massive war crimes against Ukrainians, several scholars assumed that a genocide was being committed in Ukraine. The Siege of Mariupol, the Bucha massacre, and the deportation of Ukrainian children to Russia so they could be forcibly adopted by Russian families were all classified as genocidal acts, while the words of Putin's officials, such as "There is no Ukraine", have been cited as examples of genocidal intent. Historian Alexander Etkind wrote that the genocidal aspects of Russian war crimes in Ukraine did not just include mass murder and deportation, they also included the intentional destruction of Ukrainian cultural sites, and he also wrote that Putin framed his genocide as the "victim's revenge" for the previous one. Political scientist Scott Straus declared that "genocide may be an appropriate term to describe the violence" following the Russian invasion of Ukraine.

Russian social media users and state media pundits demonized Ukrainians, describing them as "vermin", "rats", "unpeople", "diseased", and they also wrote that Ukraine itself must be "erased". On 6 April 2022, an op-ed article which was written by Timofey Sergeytsev, What Russia Should Do with Ukraine, was published by the Russian state-owned news agency RIA Novosti. It called for the full destruction of Ukraine as a state and the full destruction of the Ukrainian people's national identity. American historian Timothy D. Snyder cited it as an example to illustrate Russia's genocidal intent.

National parliaments, including those of Poland, Ukraine, Canada, Estonia, Latvia, Lithuania and the Republic of Ireland declared that a genocide was taking place in Ukraine. On 27 May 2022, a report by the New Lines Institute for Strategy and Policy and the Raoul Wallenberg Centre for Human Rights concluded that there were reasonable grounds to infer that Russia breached two articles of the 1948 Genocide Convention, by publicly inciting genocide through its denial of Ukraine's right to exist as a state and its denial of the Ukrainian people's right to exist as a nation, as well as through its forcible transfer of Ukrainian children to Russia, which is a genocidal act under article II of the convention. A Foreign Policy article acknowledged that Putin's goal was to "erase Ukraine as a political and national entity and Russify its inhabitants", warning that Russia's war could become a genocide.

Prevention of future genocides
Helen Clark, Michael Lapsley and David Alton, writing in The Guardian, stated that the reasons for the Rwandan genocide and crimes such as the Bosnian genocide of the Yugoslav Wars had been analysed in depth and they also stated that methods of preventing future genocides had been extensively discussed. They described the analyses as producing "reams of paper [that] were dedicated to analysing the past and pledging to heed warning signs and prevent genocide". A group of 34 non-governmental organizations and 31 individuals, calling themselves African Citizens, referred to the Rwanda: The Preventable Genocide report prepared by a panel headed by former Botswana president Quett Masire for the Organisation of African Unity. African Citizens highlighted the sentences, "Indisputably, the most important truth that emerges from our investigation is that the Rwandan genocide could have been prevented by those in the international community who had the position and means to do so. ... The world failed Rwanda. ... [The United Nations] simply did not care enough about Rwanda to intervene appropriately." Chidi Odinkalu, former head of the National Human Rights Commission of Nigeria, was one of the African Citizens.

On 20 November 2021, Genocide Watch called for genocide in Ethiopia, predicted in the context of the war crimes in the Tigray War and the Ethiopian civil conflict (2018–present), to be prevented. On 21 November, Chidi Odinkalu called for genocide prevention, stating, "We need to focus on an urgent programme of Genocide Prevention advocacy on Ethiopia NOW. It may be too late in 2 weeks, guys." On 26 November, African Citizens and Clark, Lapsley & Alton also called for the predicted genocide to be prevented.

See also

Notes

References

Further reading 

Genocides
21st century